Joseph Georges Claude Pronovost (born July 22, 1935) is a Canadian former ice hockey goaltender who played three games in the National Hockey League with the Boston Bruins and Montreal Canadiens between 1956 and 1959, serving as an emergency goalie each time. The rest of his career, which lasted from 1952 to 1963, was spent in various minor leagues, mainly the Quebec Hockey League.

Playing career
Pronovost was with the Montreal Canadiens as a practice goaltender in the 1955–56 season when he played his first NHL game. On January 14, 1956, the Boston Bruins arrived to play in Montreal. The Bruins were without regular starter Terry Sawchuk and were unable to use their back up John Henderson because of equipment problems. The Canadiens loaned Pronovost to the Bruins for the game, and he recorded a shutout against his own team.

Pronovost's hockey career lasted from 1952 to 1963. He spent most of his time playing in various semi-professional leagues, including the Quebec Hockey League and the Eastern Professional Hockey League. The only other time Pronovost played in the NHL was during the 1958–59 season, when he played two games for Montreal.

Claude's brothers Marcel Pronovost and Jean Pronovost also played in the NHL.

Career statistics

Regular season and playoffs

References

External links
 

1935 births
Living people
Boston Bruins players
Calgary Stampeders (WHL) players
Canadian ice hockey goaltenders
Chicoutimi Saguenéens (QSHL) players
Edmonton Flyers (WHL) players
Hull-Ottawa Canadiens players
Ice hockey people from Quebec
Kitchener Greenshirts players
Montreal Canadiens players
Montreal Royals (EPHL) players
Montreal Royals (QSHL) players
North Bay Trappers (EPHL) players
Ontario Hockey Association Senior A League (1890–1979) players
Shawinigan-Falls Cataracts (QSHL) players
Sportspeople from Shawinigan